Warangal is a city in Telangana, India.

Warangal may also refer to

Places and administrative divisions 
 Warangal district, formerly Warangal Rural district
 Warangal Urban district, now renamed as Hanamkonda district
 Warangal mandal
 Warangal Division
 Warangal Police Commissionerate
 Warangal Tri-City
 Greater Warangal Municipal Corporation

Constituencies
 Warangal (Lok Sabha constituency)
 Warangal West (Assembly constituency)
 Warangal East (Assembly constituency)

Infrastructure
 Warangal Airport
 Warangal railway station
 Warangal Monorail
 Warangal Metro
 Outer Ring Road, Warangal

Other uses
 Warangal Fort
 Siege of Warangal (disambiguation)
 Siege of Warangal (1310), by Malik Kafur, a general of Ala al-Din Khalji
 Siege of Warangal (1318), by Khusrau Khan and other generals of Ala al-Din's son Mubarak Shah
 Siege of Warangal (1323), by Ulugh Khan (later Muhammad bin Tughluq), a general of Ghiyath al-Din Tughluq

See also
 National Institute of Technology, Warangal
 Kakatiya dynasty, 11th century dynasty who ruled from Warangal